Linn Records is a Glasgow-based record label which specialises in classical music, jazz and Scottish music. It is part of Linn Products.

History
While Linn engineers were testing their flagship product, the Sondek LP12 turntable, they became frustrated with some of the specialist test LPs they were using. Work began on an LP cutting lathe as a research product to improve testing for the LP12.

The first albums to be cut and subsequently released was A Walk Across the Rooftops by The Blue Nile. They also released Carol Kidd's award-winning debut album.

Today they are an audiophile label, specialising in classical, jazz and Celtic music, and won the Record Label of the Year award at the 2010 Gramophone Awards. Release formats include CD, SACD, HDCD, vinyl and digital downloads.

Between 1995 and 2011 Linn artwork was designed by John Haxby, a graphic artist, photographer and promoter based in Knaresborough, North Yorkshire. Since September 2013,  all artwork has been designed by GM Toucari.

High resolution downloads
As of February 2013 all 'Studio Master' downloads from linnrecords.com are available in FLAC format, ALAC (Apple Lossless Audio Codec.) and MP3. The music does not include DRM technology. The website was also updated so that embedded artwork was added to all downloads.

In 2008, Linn Records started to host music for other labels and now offers a library of more than 700 Studio Master Quality albums from 96 different labels. The start of 2012 saw the label form a partnership with Universal to sell a huge range of their back catalogue.

Artists

Classical artists include:
Avison Ensemble
Alfie Boe
Boston Baroque
Katherine Bryan
John Butt (musician)
Dunedin Consort
Ingrid Fliter
James Gilchrist
Peter Harvey (baritone)
Ruthie Henshall
Yuniko Kato
Sir Charles Mackerras
Sivan Magen
Nigel North
Martin Pearlman
Phantasm (music group)
Trevor Pinnock
Artur Pizarro
The Prince Consort
Profeti della Quinta
Robin Ticciati
Scottish Chamber Orchestra
 Trio Sonnerie
Willard White
Benjamin Zander

Jazz artists include:
Liane Carroll
Ray Gelato
Barb Jungr
Carol Kidd
Claire Martin
Ian Shaw
Martin Taylor

Other artists include:
Amy Duncan
Emily Barker
Fiona Mackenzie
Maeve O'Boyle
William Orbit

See also
 List of record labels

References

External links
 Official site

Scottish record labels
Audiophile record labels
Classical music record labels
Jazz record labels
Record labels established in 1982
British companies established in 1982
1982 establishments in Scotland